Meel may refer to:
 Indian club
 Nico van der Meel